Badri Lal Chitrakar (February 1920 – 2018) was an Indian traditional painter and dealer in antiquities. He was presented with the National Award in 1987, and the Shilp Guru award on 9 September 2006. He lived and worked for most of his life in Bhilwara, a town in Rajasthan, India.

Life and career
He was born in February 1920 and was an acclaimed master in Indian traditional paintings. He has guided a number of students nationally and internationally and has trained all his sons (notably Late Gyan Prakash Soni, Sharad Soni, Trilok Prakash Soni-also a national award winner for 2014) and his grand children like Manish Soni, Kuldeepak soni and Naveen soni.

He was also a dealer in Indian antiquities, and was known for his mastery in restoration of paintings. One of his works includes a portrait of Maharana Bhupal Singh of Mewar, made on an ivory slab, for which he was honoured with the National Award by Ministry of Textiles, by the Government of India in 1987. Another includes the thousand drawings of Lord Ganesha, where each Ganesha conveys the meaning and mood of a thousand different Ganesha names, as mentioned in old Indian scriptures. His works are housed in a number of museums and private art collections across the world.

Chitrakar was credited with keeping traditional Indian art schools alive through his successors and students. He experimented with different materials, techniques of Indian art, and had an expertise in preparing pigments. He died in 2018.

Awards
He has been conferred the following awards:
 Shilp Guru Award – nominated, 2004 / winner, 2006
 National Award of Master craftsperson – 1987
 Pune Festival Award

References

External links
Crafts Council of India (Link to Badri Lal Chitrakar details)
An article from India Today magazine

1920 births
2018 deaths
Indian artisans
People from Bhilwara district
Rajasthani people